Ofe Ujuju is a local dish gotten from the south-eastern part of Nigeria. The soup is popular among the ika and agbor people of Delta State.

The soup is made with Ujuju leaves, meats, fish, black pepper and  seasoning cubes.

Other foods 
Ofe Ujuju is served with Eba, fufu, semovita and Pounded yam.

References 

Igbo cuisine
Nigerian soups
Vegetable dishes
Meat dishes